Joyce Mansour nee Joyce Patricia Adès, (25 July 1928 – 27 August 1986), was an Egyptian-French author, notable as a surrealist poet. She became the best known surrealist female poet, author of 16 books of poetry, as well as a number of important prose and theatre pieces.

Biography
Mansour was born in Bowden in England, to Jewish-Egyptian parents and lived in Cheshire for a month before her parents moved the family to Cairo, Egypt. During her youth, Mansour excelled as a runner and a high jumper. She also competed in equestrian competitions.

Mansour first came in contact with Parisian surrealism while still living in Cairo. She moved to Paris in 1953 at the age of 20. In 1947, her first marriage at the age of 19 ended after six months when her husband died. Her second marriage was to Samir Mansour in 1949 and they divided their time between Cairo and Paris. Mansour began to write in French.

She died of cancer in Paris in 1986.

Career 
Mansour’s first published collection of poems, titled: Cris, was published in Paris in 1953 by Pierre Seghers. This collection of work references male and female anatomy in explicit language that was unusual for the time.  Religious language can also be found. However, it is inverted, replacing what would be Christ with the lover. References of Egyptian mythology are also present in Cris. Mansour references the White Goddess as well as Hathor.

In 1954, Joyce Mansour became involved with the surrealist movement after Jean-Louise Bédouin wrote a review praising Cris in Médium: Communication surréaliste that May. Joyce Mansour actively participated in the second wave of surrealism in Paris. Her apartment was a popular meeting place for members of the surrealist group. L'exécution du testament du Marquis de Sade, the performance piece by Jean Benoît took place in Mansour’s apartment.

She collaborated with representatives such as Pierre Alechinsky, Enrico Baj, Hans Bellmer, Gerardo Chávez, Jorge Camacho, Ted Joans, Pierre Molinier, Reinhoud d'Haese and Max Walter Svanberg.

Work

Poetry
 « Cris», Ed. Seghers, París, 1953
 « Déchirures», Les Éditions de Minuit, París, 1955
 « Rapaces», Ed. Seghers, París, 1960
 « Carré blanc», Le Soleil Noir, París, 1966
 « Les Damnations», Ed. Visat, París, 1967
 « Phallus et momies», Éd. Daily Bul, 1969
 « Astres et désastres», 1969
 « Anvil Flowers», 1970
 « Prédelle Alechinsky à la ligne», 1973
 « Pandemonium», 1976
 « Faire signe au machiniste», 1977
 « Sens interdits», 1979
 « Le Grand Jamais», 1981
 « Jasmin d'hiver», 1982
 « Flammes immobiles», 1985
 « Trous noirs», Ed. La pierre d'Alun, Bruxelles, 1986 (illustrated by fundamental Peruvian painter Gerardo Chávez)
 Emerald Wounds: Selected Poems, published by City Lights Books. 7/11/2023. .

Prose
 « Les Gisants satisfaits», Jean-Jacques Pauvert, París, 1958
 « Jules César», Éd. Pierre Seghers, París, 1956
 « Le Bleu des fonds», Le Soleil Noir, París, 1968
 « Ça», Le Soleil Noir, París, 1970
 « Histoires nocives», Gallimard, París, 1973

Bibliography
 Marie-Francine Mansour, Une vie surréaliste, Joyce Mansour, complice d'André Breton, France-Empire, 2014.

References

Further reading
 Marie-Claire Barnet, La Femme cent sexes ou les genres communicants. Deharme, Mansour, Prassinos, Peter Lang, 1998
 Jean-Louis Bédouin, Anthologie de la poésie surréaliste, Éd. Pierre Seghers, Paris, 1983, p. 285
 Adam Biro & René Passeron, Dictionnaire général du surréalisme et de ses environs, co-édition Office du livre, Fribourg (Suisse) et Presses universitaires de France, Paris, 1982
 Stéphanie Caron, Réinventer le lyrisme. Le surréalisme de Joyce Mansour, Droz, Genève 2007. 
 Stéphanie Caron, « De la création comme (re)commencement. Petit aperçu sur la genèse des récits de Joyce Mansour : le cas "Napoléon" », in Pleine Marge n° 37, mai 2003
 Georgiana Colvile, Scandaleusement d'elles. Trente-quatre femmes surréalistes, Jean-Michel Place, Paris, 1999, pp. 186–195.
 Georgiana Colvile, « Joyce Mansour et "Les Gisants satisfaits", trente ans après », in Avant-Garde no 4, Rodopi, 1990.
 Marco Conti, Joyce Mansour, l'eros senza fine, Poesia no 127, Crocetti, 1999
 Alain Marc, Écrire le cri, Sade, Bataille, Maïakovski..., preface by Pierre Bourgeade, l'Écarlate, 2000 
 J. H. Matthews, Joyce Mansour, Rodopi, Amsterdam, 1985
 Marie-Laure Missir, Joyce Mansour, une étrange demoiselle, Jean-Michel Place, Paris, 2005 
 Richard Stamelman, Le Fauve parfum du plaisir, poésie et éros chez Joyce Mansour, Lachenal & Ritter
 Richard Stamelman, La Femme s'entête, la part du féminin dans le surréalisme, Lachenal & Ritter "Pleine Marge", 1998

1928 births
1986 deaths
20th-century British poets
Egyptian Jews
Jewish poets
Egyptian women poets
Surrealist dramatists and playwrights
Surrealist artists
Women surrealist artists
Surrealist writers
Surrealist writers by nationality
Surrealist poets
British surrealist writers
British surrealist artists
British women poets